Bisalpur may refer to:

 Bisalpur, Nepal, a village development committee in Baitadi District of western Nepal
 Bisalpur, Pilibhit, a city in Uttar Pradesh, India
 Bisalpur (Assembly constituency)
 Bisalpur, Rajasthan, a town in the Tonk district of India; located beside the Bisalpur Dam